Sugata Marjit is the former Vice Chancellor of the University of Calcutta and currently the First Distinguished Professor at Indian Institute of Foreign Trade and the Project Director of Centre for Training & Research in Public Finance and Policy (CTRPFP) [A Ministry of Finance, Government of India funded initiative]. He is a Ph.D. at the University of Rochester and currently the Editor of South Asian Journal of Macroeconomics and Public Finance. He used to be the Director of Centre for Studies in Social Sciences, Calcutta from March 2007 to March 2012 and Reserve Bank of India Chair Professor of Industrial Economics at CSSSC till September, 2019. On 15 July 2015 he took the charge as an interim Vice-Chancellor of the prestigious University of Calcutta, Kolkata, India.

Awards and honors

 Recipient of the Panchanan Chakravarty Memorial Award (1999) awarded by the Bengal Economic Association for promoting teaching and research in West Bengal, India
 Mahalanobis Memorial Medal, Indian Econometric Society, 2002
 Recipient of the best paper award US$10000 from the Global Development Network (World Bank) on the theme “Globalization and Inequality” (2003)
 V.K.R.V. Rao National Award for Young Social Scientist (Economics, 2003) by the Indian Council of Social Science Research ( Ministry of HRD., Govt. of India) 
 External Research Fellow - Nottingham Centre for Research on Globalization and Economic Policy(GEP), University of Nottingham (2008 - ) 
 Prof. AL Nagar Fellow, Indian Econometric Society, 2020

Publications

Books
 
 
 
 
 
  
Marjit, Sugata; Mandal, Biswajit; Nakanishi, Noritsugu (2020). "Virtual Trade and Comparative Advantage : The Fourth Dimension".  Springer Nature. Springer Singapore.  .

References

Living people
20th-century Bengalis
Bengali Hindus
Scientists from Kolkata
Indian scientists
21st-century Indian scientists
University of Calcutta alumni
University of Rochester alumni
Vice Chancellors of the University of Calcutta
Articles containing video clips
Year of birth missing (living people)
Indian economists
21st-century Indian economists
Indian scholars
21st-century Indian scholars